Veltuzumab is a monoclonal antibody (targeted at CD20) which is being investigated for the treatment of non-Hodgkin's lymphoma. , it is undergoing Phase I/II clinical trials. When used with milatuzumab it showed activity.

This drug was developed by Immunomedics, Inc. and was originally known as IMMU-106.

In August 2015 the US FDA granted it orphan drug status for immune thrombocytopenia (ITP). A phase II trial is planned to run for 5 years.

See also 
CD20 antagonist

References 

Monoclonal antibodies